Bandor may refer to:
 Bandor-e Olya
 Bandor-e Sofla, Kermanshah

See also
 Bandar (disambiguation)
 Bon Dor (disambiguation)